The Guam Daily Post is a newspaper based in Tamuning, in the United States territory of Guam. It is owned by the Ho S. Eun Trust and is published seven days a week. 

The paper started in 2004 as the Guam edition of the Marianas Variety, which is based in Saipan. Ho S. Eun, the owner of local construction firm Core Tech International, bought the paper in 2015 and renamed it to The Guam Daily Post, when the newspaper was reportedly not making a profit. The Post and Pacific Daily News are the only two newspapers on Guam; Post CEO Mindy Aguon states that it surpassed Daily News circulation in late 2017.

References

External links 
 

2004 establishments in Guam
Newspapers published in Guam
Publications established in 2004